Parawa is a  locality in New Zealand.

Parawa may also refer to.

Parawa, the Aboriginal name for the headland of Cape Jervis in South Australia
Parawa, an alternative name for the village of Parva, Parbhani in India
Parawa, South Australia, a locality 
Parawa language, a South American indigenous language